Nenad Trunić (born 6 February 1968) is a Serbian professor of basketball, as well as basketball coach and former player.

Playing career

Professional career 
A point guard, Trunić played for Sloboda Dita, Smelt Olimpija, Crvena zvezda, Radnički Beograd, OKK Beograd, Libertas Livorno, APU Udine, Oyak Renault, FV Lugano, Legia Warsaw, Albacomp, Apollon Limassol, Klosterneuburg, and Radnički Kragujevac.

National team career 
In August 1985, Trunić was a member of the Yugoslav cadet team that won the gold medal at the European Championship for Cadets in Ruse, Bulgaria. Over seven tournament games, he averaged 4.2 points per game.

Post-playing career 
During the 2005–06 NBA season, Trunić was an international scout for the Sacramento Kings in charge for the Eastern Europe.

During the late-2000s, Trunić was a member of the Basketball Federation of Serbia Experts Council with Božidar Maljković, Dušan Ivković, Svetislav Pešić, and Ranko Žeravica.

Trunić has been a lecturer at FIBA Europe Coaching Clinics since 2011, and at the FIBA Europe Coaching Certificate Program since 2013.

During the late-2010s, Trunić was an advisor of the Iran national team and youth system coordinator at the Iran Basketball Federation.

National team coaching career 
In 2009, Trunić was the head coach of the Serbia men's national under-16 team that won a bronze medal at the FIBA Europe Under-16 Championship in Kaunas, Lithuania.

In 2017, Trunić was the head coach of the Serbia men's national under-17 team at the FIBA Under-17 World Championship in Hamburg, Germany. His team finished 5th with a 4–4 record. 

In November 2021, Trunić was named an assistant coach for the Serbia national team under Svetislav Pešić.

Academic career 
Trunić earned his bachelor's degree in basketball in 1992, his master's degree in 2004, both from the University of Belgrade. He earned a doctorate in Belgrade in 2006, with the thesis Forecasting and strategy for creating top basketball players.

Between 2004 and 2014, Trunić was as a professor at the Belgrade School of Sports and Health Studies, as a lead lecturer for courses: Theory and Methodology of Basketball, Basics of Sports Training, Pedagogical Practice in Basketball, Methodology of Techniques and Tactics in Youth System Training in Sports. At the same school, he was the head of the study program Sports Coach and a mentor of a large number of graduate theses in basketball and sports training theory. Also, from 2006 to 2010, he was a professor at the Borislav Stanković Basketball Academy under the Megatrend University. 

Since 2014, Trunić has been working as a professor at the Faculty of Physical Education and Sports Management at Singidunum University in Belgrade, as a lead lecturer for courses: Basketball, Training Technology in Sports, Identification and Development of Talents in Sports, and Prioritization of Training in Sports. In the 2016–17 school year, he was the dean of the same faculty.

Books 
Source

References

External links
 
 Nenad Trunic at Google Scholar
 Nenad Trunic at ResearchGate
 Nenad Trunic at eurobasket.com
 Nenad Trunic at proballers.com
 Nenad Trunic at fibaeurope.com

1968 births
Living people
Alba Fehérvár players
Apollon Limassol BC players
BKK Radnički players
KK Crvena zvezda players
KK Olimpija players
KK Radnički Kragujevac (1950–2004) players
KK Sloboda Tuzla players
Klosterneuburg Dukes players
Legia Warsaw (basketball) players
Libertas Liburnia Basket Livorno players
Lega Basket Serie A players
Lecturers
Lugano Tigers players
Oyak Renault basketball players
OKK Beograd players
Pallalcesto Amatori Udine players
Point guards
Sacramento Kings scouts
Serbian basketball scouts
Serbian expatriate basketball people in Austria
Serbian expatriate basketball people in Bosnia and Herzegovina
Serbian expatriate basketball people in Cyprus
Serbian expatriate basketball people in Hungary
Serbian expatriate basketball people in Iran
Serbian expatriate basketball people in Italy
Serbian expatriate basketball people in Poland
Serbian expatriate basketball people in Slovenia
Serbian expatriate basketball people in Spain
Serbian expatriate basketball people in Switzerland
Serbian expatriate basketball people in Turkey
Serbian men's basketball coaches
Serbian men's basketball players
Sportspeople from Kragujevac
University of Belgrade Faculty of Sport and Physical Education alumni
Yugoslav men's basketball players